Similosodus ursulus is a species of beetle in the family Cerambycidae. It was described by Francis Polkinghorne Pascoe in 1866, originally under the genus Sodus. It is known from Malaysia.

References

ursulus
Beetles described in 1866